The Cessna 400, marketed as the Cessna TTx, is a single-engine, fixed-gear, low-wing general aviation aircraft built from composite materials by Cessna Aircraft. The Cessna 400 was originally built by Columbia Aircraft as the Columbia 400 until December 2007. From 2013, the aircraft was built as the Cessna TTx Model T240.

Cessna 400 production was ended in February 2018.

Design and development
The Cessna 400 was derived from the normally aspirated Columbia 300, which in turn was derived from the Lancair ES kit aircraft.

The 400 is powered by a turbocharged Continental TSIO-550-C engine producing  at 2600 rpm. The 400 features a Garmin G1000 glass cockpit that was later incorporated into the 300 to create the Cessna 350.

The 400's Continental TSIO-550-C engine is capable of being operated lean of peak. At the same operating parameters and  lean of peak the 400 was measured at  TAS and /hr (106.8 lb/hr, 67.6 L/hr).

In a 2006 review, Richard L. Collins of Flying magazine said of the 400:

The Columbia 400 was marketed with an optional ice protection system, known as E-Vade that was not certified for flight into known icing. The system consists of heat-conducting graphite foil panels on the wing and tail leading edges. These panel areas are heated by 70 volt 100 amp electrical power delivered from a dedicated alternator. The system is controlled by a single switch.

The 400 features optional speedbrakes mounted on the wing's top surfaces.

The 400 nosewheel is not directly steerable; directional control while taxiing is accomplished using differential braking on the mainwheels.

Initially sold simply as the Cessna 400, the aircraft was given the marketing name Corvalis TT for twin turbocharged by Cessna on 14 January 2009. The name is a derivation of the town of Corvallis, Oregon which is west of the Bend, Oregon location of the Cessna plant that built the aircraft, prior to closing the plant and relocating production to Independence, Kansas in 2009.

In April 2009 Cessna announced that it would close the Bend, Oregon factory where the Cessna 400 was produced and move production to Independence, Kansas, with the composite construction moved to Mexico. The production line was restarted in October, 2009 in the Cessna Independence paint facility, at a rate of one aircraft per six months initially. This was to allow the new workers, plus the 30 employees transferred from Bend, to gain experience and also allow Cessna the opportunity to retail its unsold inventory of Cessna 350s and 400s. At that time the company anticipated moving the 350/400 production to a permanent facility by the end of 2009.

In December 2010 a Cessna 400 that was being test flown by an FAA test pilot at the factory developed a fuel leak, the cause of which was determined to be that the aircraft had "suffered a significant structural failure in the wing during a production acceptance flight test. The wing skin disbonded from the upper forward wing spar. The length of the disbond was approximately 7 feet." As a result, the FAA issued an Emergency Airworthiness Directive affecting seven Cessna 400s and one 350, all on the production line. The AD did not affect any customer aircraft in service, but did delay deliveries. In September 2011 the Federal Aviation Administration proposed a US$2.4M fine against the company for its failure to follow quality assurance requirements while producing fiberglass components at its plant in Chihuahua, Mexico. Excess humidity meant that the parts did not cure correctly and quality assurance did not detect the problems. The FAA also discovered 82 other aircraft parts that had been incorrectly made and not detected by the company's quality assurance.

On 29 March 2011 Cessna unveiled several improvements to the Cessna 400 at Sun 'n Fun, designating the new variant the TTx. The aircraft has not been selling well since the late-2000s recession started, with 110 delivered in 2008, the first year Cessna produced the model, 41 in 2009 and just seven sold in 2010. The improved aircraft features a new glass cockpit panel, designed by Cessna and based on the Garmin G2000. The updated model also has dual Attitude and Heading Reference Systems, a GFC 700 autopilot, a Garmin GTS800 traffic avoidance system, Garmin GTX 33ES transponder with ADS-B and the Garmin Electronic Stability Protection System, which protects the aircraft from operations outside the approved flight envelope. The new TTx model has no traditional instruments and instead employs the L-3 Trilogy as a back-up. The TTx also features a built-in pulse oximeter, a new paint scheme and a new interior. By the end of Sun 'n Fun 2011 the company indicated it had sold 16 of the new TTx model.

At Sun 'n Fun in March 2012 the company announced that a flight-into-known icing package would be an option on the TTx model. The system will provide up to 2.5 hours icing protection.

The design's production came to an end in February 2018. Sales of the model had been poor, with only 23 examples sold in 2017, compared to its main competitor, the Cirrus SR22, which sold 309 units that same year.

Weights
The 400's maximum take-off weight is 3600 lbs (1633 kg) and the maximum landing weight is 3420 lbs (1551 kg). A typical empty weight without deicing equipment is 2575 lbs (1168 kg). With a full fuel load this leaves 413 lbs (187 kg) for crew and baggage.

Certification
The aircraft was originally certified by the Federal Aviation Administration under FAR 23, on April 8, 2004 as the Model LC41-550FG (for Lancair Certified, Model 41, Continental 550 engine, Fixed Gear) and marketed under the designation Columbia 400. EASA certification was added in February 2009.

The Cessna 400 is certified in the Utility Category, with a  positive limit maneuvering load factor of 4.4, whereas most comparable aircraft (such as the Cessna 182 and Cirrus SR22) were certified in the Normal Category with a load factor of 3.8.

The 400 has a certified airframe maximum life of 25,200 flight hours.

Variants
Columbia 400
Initial model produced by Columbia Aircraft
Cessna 400 TT Corvalis 
Initial Cessna-produced model, TT designating Twin Turbocharged
Cessna TTx Model T240
Improved Cessna model announced in March 2011, with upgraded avionics and interior. The TTx first flew on 2 March 2013 and is equipped with Garmin G2000 14 avionics and a  Continental TSIO-550-C. Certification for Flight Into Known Icing (FIKI) was added in June 2014.

Specifications (Cessna 400)

See also

References

External links

Official website archives on Archive.org
Columbia 400 Review 

400
400
1990s United States civil utility aircraft
Single-engined tractor aircraft
Low-wing aircraft
Aircraft first flown in 2004